Minsk family of mainframe computers was developed and produced in the Byelorussian SSR from 1959 to 1975.

Models
The MINSK-1 was a vacuum-tube digital computer that went into production in 1960.

The MINSK-2 was a solid-state digital computer that went into production in 1962.

The MINSK-22 was a modified version of Minsk-2 that went into production in 1965.

The MINSK-23 went into production in 1966.

The most advanced model was Minsk-32, developed in 1968. It supported COBOL, FORTRAN and ALGAMS (a version of ALGOL).  This and earlier versions also used a machine-oriented language called AKI (AvtoKod "Inzhener", i.e., "Engineer's Autocode"). It stood somewhere between the native assembly language SSK (Sistema Simvolicheskogo Kodirovaniya, or "System of symbolic coding") and higher-level languages, like FORTRAN.

The word size was 31 bits for Minsk-1 and 37 bits for the other models.

At one point the Minsk-222 (an upgraded prototype based on the most popular model, Minsk-22) and Minsk-32 were considered as a potential base for a future unified line of mutually compatible mainframes — that would later become the ES EVM line, but despite being popular among users, good match between their tech and Soviet tech base and familiarity to both programmers and technicians lost to the proposal to copy the IBM/360 line of mainframes — the possibility to just copy all the software existing for it was deemed more important.

See also
 Mark Nemenman

References

Further reading
  (NB. Has info on the Minsk-32 character set.)

External links 
 Russian Virtual Computer Museum

Belarusian inventions
Soviet inventions
Mainframe computers
Science and technology in Belarus
Ministry of Radio Industry (USSR) computers